Nchanga is a constituency of the National Assembly of Zambia. It covers the north-eastern areas of Chingola in Chingola District of Copperbelt Province.

List of MPs

References

Constituencies of the National Assembly of Zambia
1964 establishments in Zambia
Constituencies established in 1964